In 1969, Girna Dam was constructed on the Girna River near Nandgaon in the Nasik District of Maharashtra state in India.

Specifications

See also
 Dams in Maharashtra
 List of reservoirs and dams in India

References

Dams in Nashik district
Dams completed in 1969
1969 establishments in Maharashtra